Gwamile Vocational and Commercial Training Institute is one of the principal institutes of higher learning in Eswatini.  It was founded in 1987 under the auspices of the German Technical Cooperation Agency (GTZ) and the Eswatini Government. The campus is located in Kwaluseni, in the center of the country, two kilometers from the University of Eswatini.  The school is known as Gwamile Voctim.

Programs
Gwamile Voctim currently offers the following programs:
Automotive Engineering   
Commercial Studies 
Electrical Engineering  
Mechanical Engineering  
Trowel Trades  
Wood Trades

External links
 Gwamile Vocational and Commercial Training Institute at Swaziplace.com

References

Education in Eswatini
Educational institutions established in 1987
1987 establishments in Swaziland
Manzini Region